Events in the year 2020 in Brunei.

Incumbents

Events 
Ongoing — COVID-19 pandemic in Brunei

 9 March – The Ministry of Health confirms the first case of COVID-19.
 15 March – The Bruneian Government barred all citizens and foreign residents from leaving as a result of the COVID-19 pandemic. Mass gatherings are also banned.
 31 March – Kristal-Astro, sole operator of Brunei's multi-channel pay-TV service shuts down after 22 years in operation due to 'fast-changing technology trends'.
 2 June – Most schools partially reopened and the majority of classes resumed as normal.

Sports 

 28 July – 8 August: Brunei at the 2022 Commonwealth Games
 The Football Association of Brunei Darussalam suspends all games due to the COVID-19 pandemic.

Death 

 24 October – Prince Azim of Brunei, 38, Bruneian royal and film producer (You're Not You)

References 

 

 
2020s in Brunei
Years of the 21st century in Brunei
Brunei
Brunei